Witów may refer to the following places in Poland:
Witów, Lower Silesian Voivodeship (south-west Poland)
Witów, Kutno County in Łódź Voivodeship (central Poland)
Witów, Łęczyca County in Łódź Voivodeship (central Poland)
Witów, Piotrków County in Łódź Voivodeship (central Poland)
Witów, Gmina Burzenin in Łódź Voivodeship (central Poland)
Witów, Gmina Warta in Łódź Voivodeship (central Poland)
Witów, Proszowice County in Lesser Poland Voivodeship (south Poland)
Witów, Tatra County in Lesser Poland Voivodeship (south Poland)
Witów, Silesian Voivodeship (south Poland)